The Lifan 620 is a four-door compact sedan produced by the Lifan Motors division of Lifan Group. The model spawned a few facelift variants in the years after its launch, with the 630 launched in 2014 and the 650 launched in 2016.

Overview
Launched in 2009, the styling of the compact sedan is said to resemble the BMW 3-series without the kidney grilles especially from the front.

Powertrain
The Lifan 620 is powered by a 4-cylinder engines 1.6 L (1587cc) Tritec engine producing  or 116hp.

Markets
The Lifan 620 is sold in China in and several export markets including Vietnam. In Russia, where it is assembled by Derways, it is known as the Lifan Solano. In a Tunisian plant the model is assembled since 2012 by Martin Motors as the Martin Motors MM620 for the European markets.

Production in Iran
A modified version of Lifan 620 sporting Lifan 620's 1.8L I4 engine is assembled in Iran by a company named Kerman Motor.

Lifan 630
For the 2014 model year, a restyled version called the Lifan 630 was available. Prices of the 630 ranges from 54,900 yuan to 72,900 yuan with an electric version also available.

The 630 is available with a 1.5-litre engine codenamed LF479Q2 producing 94hp and 128N·m and a 1.5-litre VVT engine codenamed LF479Q2-B producing 103hp and 133N·m. Both engines are mated to a 5-speed manual transmission.

Lifan 650
The Lifan 650 is a four-door compact sedan that is essentially a restyled Lifan 620, with a completely redesigned front and rear DRG. It is the replacement for the 620 and 630 sedans.

Launched during the 2016 Beijing Auto Show, Lifan 650 was priced between 55,800 yuan to 65,800 yuan. the 650 sedan is powered by a 4-cylinder engines 1.5 L engine producing .

ChangJiang 360e
The ChangJiang 360e is an electric compact sedan made in 2016 based on the Lifan 650. It uses a 100 kW motor. The 360e has 5 doors and 4 seats. Its dimensions are 4625 mm/1715 mm/1510 mm, and has a kerb weight of 1,850 kg.

References

External links

Lifan Motors website

2010s cars
Lifan 620
Cars of China
Compact cars
620
Sedans